J. alkaliphilus may refer to:

Janibacter alkaliphilus , a Gram-positive bacterium
Jeotgalibacillus alkaliphilus, a Gram-positive bacterium